Meadow Nook is an antebellum house in Atlanta, Georgia. It is located at 2420 Alston Drive in the East Lake neighborhood, in DeKalb County. It is one of only three antebellum homes still standing in their original locations within the city limits.

Meadow Nook was the country home of Lt. Col. Robert Augustus Alston (1832–1879) and Mrs. Alston, the former Mary Charlotte Magill (d. 1884) of Georgetown County, South Carolina.  Robert Alston was a journalist and legislator who was murdered at the Georgia State Capitol in 1879, as a result of his ongoing exposés of the abusive convict labor leasing system.

See also
National Register of Historic Places listings in DeKalb County, Georgia

References

Further reading
 Atlanta Historical Society. Atlanta Historical Journal, Volumes 24-25, pp. 27, 31
 William R. Mitchell Classic Atlanta, p.56 (mistakenly calls the house "Meadownook")
See also Alston's biography, linked below.

External links
 East Lake History
Murder in the State Capitol: The Biography of Lt. Col. Robert Augustus Alston, 2013 book by Pamela Chase Hain

Houses in Atlanta
Antebellum architecture
Houses on the National Register of Historic Places in Georgia (U.S. state)
Houses completed in 1856
National Register of Historic Places in Atlanta